Dru Smith (born December 30, 1997) is an American professional basketball player for the Brooklyn Nets of the National Basketball Association (NBA), on a two-way contract with the Long Island Nets of the NBA G League. He played college basketball for the Evansville Purple Aces and the Missouri Tigers.

High school career
Smith attended FJ Reitz High School in Evansville, Indiana. In his junior season he averaged 10.5 points, 5.4 rebounds and 4.5 assists per game as a starting point guard alongside Jaelan Sanford and Alex Stein. Smith helped his team achieve a 29–2 record and reach the Class 4A state title game. As a senior, he averaged 20.8 points, 7.3 assists, seven rebounds and 4.1 steals per game, leading Reitz to a 22–5 record and the Class 4A regional finals. Smith was named to the Indiana All-Star team. He committed to playing college basketball for Evansville over offers from Ball State, Northern Kentucky, South Alabama and Indiana State. Smith was drawn to the school because it was close to home.

College career

Evansville
On February 22, 2017, Smith scored a freshman-season high 19 points for Evansville, making five three-pointers, in a 109–83 loss to Wichita State. As a freshman, he averaged 5.3 points, 2.9 assists and 2.6 rebounds per game, earning Missouri Valley Conference (MVC) All-Freshman Team honors. On December 5, 2017, Smith recorded a sophomore season-high 25 points, shooting 11-of-13 from the field, seven assists and four steals in a 91–76 win over Bowling Green. As a sophomore, he averaged 13.7 points, 4.6 assists and two steals per game, leading the MVC with a 48.2 three-point field goal percentage. He was named to the MVC Most Improved Team.

Missouri
After his sophomore season, Smith transferred to Missouri over offers from Xavier and Virginia Tech. He sat out the following season due to National Collegiate Athletic Association transfer rules. On November 12, 2019, he posted his first career double-double of 22 points and 10 rebounds in a 63–58 overtime loss to Xavier. On February 15, 2020, he scored a junior season-high 28 points in an 85–73 victory over 11th-ranked Auburn. As a junior, Smith averaged 12.7 points, 4.2 rebounds, 3.9 assists and 2.1 steals per game. He recorded 64 steals, which led the Southeastern Conference (SEC) and ranked sixth in program history. As a senior, Smith averaged 14.3 points, 3.8 assists, 3.5 rebounds and 2.1 steals per game.

Professional career

Miami Heat / Sioux Falls Skyforce (2021–2023)
After going undrafted in the 2021 NBA Draft, Smith joined the Miami Heat for the 2021 NBA Summer League and on September 10, he signed a contract with the Heat. He was waived prior to the start of the season and joined the Sioux Falls Skyforce as an affiliate player. On February 1, 2022, Smith was waived after being ruled out for the season with a knee injury.

On October 13, 2022, Smith was signed to a two-way contract with the Miami Heat. He was waived by the Heat on November 13, and subsequently re-joined the Skyforce. On November 25, 2022, Smith was re-signed to a two-way contract with the Heat and subsequently waived on December 11, and re-joined the Skyforce two days later.

Brooklyn Nets (2023–present)
On January 13, 2023, Smith signed a two-way contract with the Brooklyn Nets.

Career statistics

NBA

|-
| style="text-align:left;"|
| style="text-align:left;"|Miami
| 5 || 1 || 13.4 || .357 || .167 ||  || 1.8 || 1.0 || .8 || .6 || 2.2
|- class="sortbottom"
| style="text-align:center;" colspan="2"|Career
| 5 || 1 || 13.4 || .357 || .167 ||  || 1.8 || 1.0 || .8 || .6 || 2.2

College

|-
| style="text-align:left;"|2016–17
| style="text-align:left;"|Evansville
| 28 || 8 || 22.5 || .445 || .327 || .818 || 2.6 || 2.9 || .8 || .4 || 5.3
|-
| style="text-align:left;"|2017–18
| style="text-align:left;"|Evansville
| 22 || 22 || 30.2 || .578 || .482 || .862 || 3.5 || 4.6 || 2.0 || .5 || 13.7
|-
| style="text-align:left;"|2018–19
| style="text-align:left;"|Missouri
| style="text-align:center;" colspan="11"|  Redshirt
|-
| style="text-align:left;"|2019–20
| style="text-align:left;"|Missouri
| 31 || 31 || 32.8 || .412 || .294 || .899 || 4.2 || 3.9 || 2.1 || .4 || 12.7
|-
| style="text-align:left;"|2020–21
| style="text-align:left;"|Missouri
| 26 || 26 || 34.1 || .442 || .398 || .833 || 3.5 || 3.8 || 2.1 || .3 || 14.3
|- class="sortbottom"
| style="text-align:center;" colspan="2"|Career
| 107 || 87 || 29.9 || .459 || .373 || .865 || 3.5 || 3.8 || 1.7 || .4 || 11.4

References

External links

 Evansville Purple Aces bio
 Missouri Tigers bio

1997 births
Living people
American men's basketball players
Basketball players from Indiana
Brooklyn Nets players
Evansville Purple Aces men's basketball players
Long Island Nets players
Miami Heat players
Missouri Tigers men's basketball players
Point guards
Shooting guards
Sioux Falls Skyforce players
Sportspeople from Evansville, Indiana
Undrafted National Basketball Association players